According to the Kakawin Nagarakretagama canto XIII and XIV, the following areas are recognized as conquered or subordinate to Majapahit (referred to as mañcanagara). The conquered states in Java were not mentioned because they were still considered part of the royal "mandala".

The names below are based on manuscript sources, both from Majapahit and Malay manuscripts as well as Chinese sources, but little physical evidence remains of an area's recognition of state power.

Included were the kingdoms of Sunda and Madura, because Majapahit claimed the whole of Java. Sunda kingdom became a vassal of Majapahit after the battle of Bubat of 1357.

Nagakretagama transcription

Canto 6
Stanza 4

3.  

4.

Canto 42
Stanza 2

4.

Canto 13
Stanza 1

 
 
 
 

Stanza 2

Canto 14
Stanza 1

 
 
 
 

Stanza 2

 
 
 
 

Stanza 3

 
 
 
 

Stanza 4

 
 
 
 

Stanza 5

 
 
 
 

In this list also given the modern name of a place if it has been agreed by historians.

Interpretation

Sumatra
Sumatra is referred to in Negarakretagama as "Malayu"

Borneo
Borneo is referred to as "Nusa Tanjung Nagara" and/or "Tanjungpuri"

Malayan peninsula
In Nagarakretagama it is called "Hujung Medini", which refers to the Malay Peninsula (according to M. Yamin) or Johor (according to Pigeaud).

Regions in the east of Java

Overseas region 
Foreign or overseas territories are mentioned in Nagarakretagama canto 15 stanza 1. In addition, in canto 83 stanza 4 and 93 stanza 1 are mentioned the places that became the origin of merchants and scholars.

According to Irawan Djoko Nugroho, the area in the table above from Syangka to Cambodia is called Desantara. Its etymological meaning is "all directions, all space, other regions, other countries". The relationship between Majapahit and Desantara is called kachaya, which means "to be exposed to light". It is interpreted as protected or sheltered. The term "protected area" in the modern state system is referred to as a protectorate.

What is different is Yawana, as mentioned anyat i yawana mitreka satata (the other is Yawana who is a permanent ally). Kern and Pigeaud consider Yawana to be Annam, but they noted that Yawana is the Sanskrit term for Greek (Ionian), which the Indians used to refer to barbarians. Kern notes that the Indians referred to Muslims as Yawana. According to Pigeaud, it is somewhat improbable that Yawana refers to the Muslim. He considered Yawana to be Annam, because at that time the kings of Annam were very powerful and it was very strange to ask Java for protection. Nugroho rejected this opinion, because Nagarakretagama was created in 1365, and Champa's power surpassed Annam (which at that time referred to Dai Viet). Majapahit who defeated the Mongols could not have a weak permanent ally. In addition, Annam in Old Javanese has its own name, namely Koci (now called Cochinchina to distinguish it from Kochi in India). Koci comes from the Chinese Jiāozhǐ, in Cantonese Kawci, and is called Giao Chỉ in Vietnamese. Therefore, Yawana is more accurately interpreted as Arabs.

According to Nugroho, the regions of Jambudwipa, China, Karnataka, and Goda are collectively called Dwipantara. This area is said to have received the favor of the king, so it is natural for them to pay tribute. The kindness done by Majapahit to Dwipantara has a background from Java's war with the Mongols. The Mongols tried to control Asian sea trade, and Java (Singhasari at that time) responded with a blockade of Southeast Asian trade against the Mongols. The Dwipantara area came to face Majapahit led by their priests. In canto 93.1 the priests compose a hymn of praise to the Maharaja of Majapahit. The relationship between Dwipantara to Majapahit is sumiwi (serving). Ambassadors from India and China came with merchants and played a role in stabilizing political and economic relations.

According to other accounts

Jayanegara II inscription 
The Tuhañaru/Jayanagara II inscription, dating from 1245 Saka/1323 AD, records the annexation of territories outside Java:... like the moon that opens the tunjung-jantung flower from the village of all good people; which destroys all enemies; like the sun that dispels darkness at night, which is delighted by Wipra and Satria, who are happy to be able to uphold the name of the king's coronation, it reads: Iswara Sundarapandyadewa, ...According to H.B. Sarkar, the title of the king of Jayanegara indicates that Majapahit held high power (suzerainty) over the king of Pandya in South India.

Hikayat Raja-Raja Pasai 
Hikayat Raja-Raja Pasai recorded many territories of Majapahit:

Kidung Sunda 
Based on the Kidung Sunda canto 1 stanza 54b and 65a, Majapahit territories includes Palembang, Tumasik (Singapore), Sampit, Madura, Bali, Koci (Cochinchina, Vietnam), Wandan (Banda, Central Maluku), Tanjungpura (Kalimantan) and Sawakung (Sebuku Island).

Kidung Harsa-Wijaya 
Kidung Harsa Wijaya notes that the territories of Majapahit outside Java include Bali, Tatar, Tumasik, Sampi, Gurun, Wandan, Tanjung-pura, Dompo, Palembang, Makassar, and Koci.

Sulalatus Salatin and Suma Oriental 
Based on outside sources, such as Sulalatus Salatin (Malay Annals) and Tomé Pires' book Suma Oriental. These territories include:

 Indragiri in Sumatra and Siantan (now Pontianak on the west coast of Kalimantan), which according to Sulalatus Salatin, were given as wedding gifts to the Sultanate of Malacca for the marriage of the sultan Mansur Shah of Malacca to the princess of Majapahit. Sultan Mansur Shah ruled in 1459–1477, so that in 1447 it meant that Indragiri and Siantan were still under Majapahit rule.
 Jambi and Palembang, which only began to escape from Majapahit's grip when it was taken over by the Demak Sultanate during its war against Majapahit ruled by Ranawijaya.
 And Bali which was the last refugee area for nobles, artists, priests and Hindus in Java when Majapahit conquered by Demak.

Hikayat Banjar 
The territories of Majapahit recorded by Hikayat Banjar are: Java, Bantan (Banten), Palembang, Mangkasar (Makassar), Pahang, Patani, Bali, Pasai, Champa, Maningkabau (Minangkabau), Jambi, Bugis (the area of Bugis people), Johor, and Acih (Aceh).

References

Bibliography 
 
 
 
 
 
 
 
 
 
 
 

 
1527 disestablishments in Asia
States and territories established in 1293
States and territories disestablished in 1527
Former countries in Indonesian history
Former countries in Malaysian history
Former countries in Thai history